Miriam Margarita Basilio Gaztambide (born 1967 in San Juan, Puerto Rico) is an American art historian and Associate Professor of Museum Studies and Art History at New York University.  
Basilio's intellectual interests include Latin American art, political art, and other issues of politics, art, and identity.

Education 
Basilio was awarded a Ph.D. in Art History from The Institute of Fine Arts, New York University in 2002.

Career 
Basilio's book Visual Propaganda, Exhibitions, and the Spanish Civil War (Surrey, UK and Burlington, NY: Ashgate, 2013) offers a look at how art and exhibitions were used as tools of propaganda during the Spanish Civil War period. In her lecture on the topic at the Guggenheim Museum in New York, she mentions that

"visual propaganda played an important role as an index of the rebel occupation of Spain, intimating the defeated and serving as a backdrop as the general 1939 victory."

In his review of the book, Yves Laberge writes "In her impressive corpus, Basilio has chosen a wide array of vintage images, posters, cartoons, and various advertisements, either pro or against the advent of a new republic in Spain. Most of these forgotten images are reproduced here in black and white, with a few exceptions in color. The author studies how various exhibitions of these images have been conceptualized, conceived, and perceived by audiences, as in the unforgettable Paris World Fair of 1937, for example, when 'the Spanish republican government presented a remarkable modernist pavilion,' which included Pablo Picasso’s latest masterpiece Guernica."
 
In her essay “Reflecting on a History of Collecting and Exhibiting Work by Artists from Latin America” in Latin American and Caribbean Art: MoMA at El Museo (New York: El Museo del Barrio; The Museum of Modern Art, 2004), Basilio writes that the Museum of Modern Art was one of the first institutions outside Latin America to collect Latin American art. Her current research focuses on the role of the Museum of Modern Art as an important institution in forming the modernist canon and the idea of “Latin American” art as a global category.

Basilio has also curated numerous exhibitions, and as a Curatorial Assistant at the Museum of Modern Art, she co-curated Tempo (2002) and Caribbean and Latin American Art: MoMA at El Museo (2004)

References

American art historians
Women art historians
1967 births
Living people
Date of birth missing (living people)
20th-century Puerto Rican historians
New York University faculty
20th-century Puerto Rican women writers
21st-century Puerto Rican women writers
21st-century Puerto Rican historians
American women historians
American women curators
American curators